Lavtarski Vrh is a small dispersed settlement above Čepulje in the Municipality of Kranj in the Upper Carniola region of Slovenia.

Geography
Lavtarski Vrh stands on a ridge where the crests of Hrastnik Hill and Planica Hill meet. It received a modern road connection in 1965, when the road from Stražišče was extended westward, toward the Selca Sora Valley.

Name
Lavtarski Vrh was attested in written sources as Waltherschogel in 1291, Waltersskhiuorch in 1584, and Woltharski Verch in 1610. It was also recorded in the past as Balterskhiwurch. In 1291 the village's name was also recorded as Hrastnica, named after Hrastnik Hill to the southwest. It is also known as Lavtršnji Vrh in the local dialect. The modern name Lavtarski Vrh is a result of dialect metathesis, and it is equivalent to Valterski Vrh, a village  to the south-southwest.

References

External links

Lavtarski Vrh on Geopedia

Populated places in the City Municipality of Kranj